Mirrors 2 is a 2010 American supernatural horror film. It is a stand-alone sequel to the 2008 film Mirrors. Released by 20th Century Fox in direct-to-video format, the film is written by Matt Venne and is directed by Víctor Garcia. It is available on DVD and Blu-ray Disc.

Plot 
Max Matheson survives a car accident that kills his fiancée, Kayla. As a result, he becomes emotionally disturbed and has to undergo psychological treatment with Dr. Beaumont who pulls the blinds in his office for privacy, making some progress in overcoming the guilt over the accident, although the other driver, who was inebriated was responsible for it. To help Max move forward, his father Jack reopens the Mayflower Department Store in New Orleans and persuades Max to replace the former security guard, who recently quit his job after cutting himself up on duty.

Max accepts the job, and his father introduces him to Keller Landreaux, the store manager, Jenna McCarty, the buyer and Ryan Parker, the vice-president of operations. Before his first shift, Max sees a vision of a dead woman in a mirror and then sees Jenna's naked reflection ripping off her head. Meanwhile, Jenna falls through her shower's glass doors upon being scared by her reflection, and a shard of glass decapitates her. Max realizes that he foresees the deaths in the mirrors. He tries to find the ghost that night but sees Ryan's reflection being eviscerated. Later, Ryan dies in the same way as his reflection.

Traumatized, Max calls his father and tells him he wants to quit. Max then sees his father's face covered in cuts in a puddle and races to his house. Jack's reflection almost kills him, but Max saves him and decides to stay at the Mayflower. Max hints to whoever is manipulating the mirrors that he will do anything she wants him to do if she spares his father. Max later returns to the Mayflower, but he is confronted by Detectives Huston and Piccirilli, who recount what happened to Ryan and Jenna. Max denies any involvement, and they let him get back to work, though they remain suspicious.

Max goes to the main mirror to find out who the ghost is. Suddenly, Max's reflection uses his flashlight to show him the way. Following the light, he finds a box containing an ID of Eleanor Reigns, a new employee of the Mayflower who disappeared two months ago. The light shines outside, and Max finds a missing person flier for Eleanor. He reads it before contacting Eleanor's older sister, Elizabeth, to learn details of her disappearance. Together, they discover that someone had deleted the surveillance files on the night of Eleanor's disappearance on the store's computer.

Max and Elizabeth visit Henry Schow, the store's former security guard and the last person who accessed the files. His reflection had scarred Henry's mouth. Through Henry, they learn that Eleanor is dead. Two months prior, during the Mayflower's groundbreaking party, Jenna and Ryan spiked Eleanor's drink with drugs. Keller raped Eleanor while she was intoxicated and finally killed her when she tried to run away. Henry found Keller burying Eleanor's body in Mayflower's basement crawlspace. Keller threatened him to delete the surveillance files to cover up his crime.

After her death, Eleanor, whose spirit is trapped in the mirror world, began seeking revenge on those responsible for her rape and murder. She manipulated Henry's reflection to eat broken shards of glass before killing Jenna and Ryan. When Eleanor realized that Max could see her, she forced him to help her make contact with her sister by threatening Jack's life. Max understands that his near-death experience from the car accident has given him the ability to see the spirits.

Max and Elizabeth go to the Mayflower and search for Eleanor's body in the basement. Keller chases them after he learns that they know what happened. He nearly strangles Elizabeth, but Max saves her, thus recreating the near-death encounter and allowing Elizabeth to see Eleanor. After seeing Eleanor again, Max wrestles Keller, pushing him into the main mirror. Eleanor, acknowledging Max for his help, pulls Keller inside the mirror and kills him, leaving Max and Elizabeth shocked.

At the police station, Henry confesses to the detectives his involvement in the cover-up of Eleanor's murder. It's implied that the police declare Keller a fugitive and blame him for Jenna and Ryan's deaths. The interrogation room's one-way mirror starts to crack when Henry is alone, and he calmly sees Eleanor in its reflection, thus giving up on survival. Eleanor kills Henry as the screen cuts to black.

Cast

Production 
Filming took place from November 16 to December 18, 2009, mainly in Baton Rouge, Louisiana.

References

External links 
 
 
 

2010 films
2010 horror films
2010 direct-to-video films
American supernatural horror films
American sequel films
American ghost films
American mystery films
Films shot in New Orleans
American rape and revenge films
Direct-to-video horror films
Direct-to-video sequel films
Regency Enterprises films
20th Century Fox direct-to-video films
Films about precognition
Films about stalking
Films directed by Víctor Garcia (Spanish director)
Films scored by Frederik Wiedmann
2010s English-language films
2010s American films